Tirumala hamata, the dark tiger, is a butterfly of the family Nymphalidae. It is distributed from  the Philippines to Australia and Pacific oceanic islands such as Samoa. In Australia, the butterflies perform mass migrations to the south in some years. In April 1995, the butterfly made a rare migratory journey to New Zealand, coinciding with the appearance of Hypolimnas bolina on the islands.

The wingspan is about 70 mm. Adults have black wings with blue spots. They are grey with black bands between segments and orange lateral lines and a black head with white markings. Adults have been observed scratching the leaves of Heliotropium amplexicaule and Parsonsia straminea, possibly to suck out moisture, or to obtain pyrrolizidine alkaloids for pheromone production and/or chemical defense.

The larvae feed on a wide range of plants including Parsonsia (including Parsonsia straminea and Parsonsia velutina), Heterostemma papuana, Heterostemma acuminatum, Hoya australis, Leichardtia, Marsdenia (including Marsdenia velutina), Secanome carnosum, Secamone elliptica, Vincetoxicum (syn. Tylophora), Cryptostegia grandiflora, Cynanchum carnosum, and Cynanchum leptolepis.

Subspecies
T. h. hamata (MacLeay, [1826]) (Australia: Cape York to Sydney)
T. h. angustata Moore, 1883 (Tonga)
T. h. arikata (Fruhstorfer, 1910) (Sula Islands)
T. h. coarctata (Joicey & Talbot, 1922) (Biak)
T. h. goana (Martin, 1910) (southern Sulawesi)
T. h. insignis (Talbot, 1943) (eastern Solomon Is.)
T. h. leucoptera (Butler, 1874) (Waigeu, Gebe, Neomfoor, West Irian)
T. h. melittula (Herrich-Schäffer, 1869) (Samoa)
T. h. moderata Butler, 1875 (Vanuatu, New Caledonia)
T. h. neomelissa Bryk, 1937 (Java)
T. h. nepthys Fruhstorfer, 1911 (Sulu Is.)
T. h. neptunia (C. & R. Felder, [1865]) (Fiji)
T. h. nigra (Martin, 1910) (Buru, Ambon, Serang, Saparua)
T. h. obscurata (Butler, 1874) (New Britain, New Ireland, Duke of York Group, Bougainville to Guadalcanal)
T. h. orientalis Semper, 1879 (Luzon, Cebu) 
T. h. pallidula (Talbot, 1943) (West Irian)
T. h. paryadres (Fruhstorfer, 1910) (Timor to Tanimbar, Aru and the Kai Islands)
T. h. subnubila (Talbot, 1943) (Papua, Yule Island)
T. h. talautensis (Talbot, 1943) (Talaud)

References

Butterflies described in 1826
Tirumala (butterfly)
Butterflies of Asia
Butterflies of Oceania
Taxa named by William Sharp Macleay